Dadra and Nagar Haveli Lok Sabha constituency is one of the two Lok Sabha constituencies in the union territory of Dadra and Nagar Haveli and Daman and Diu. This constituency is reserved for the Scheduled Tribes.

Members of Lok Sabha

Election results

17th Lok Sabha: 2021 Bye-poll 
A bye-poll was needed for this constituency due to the death of the sitting MP, Mohanbhai Sanjibhai Delkar on 22 February 2021.

17th Lok Sabha: 2019 General Elections

16th Lok Sabha: 2014 General Elections

15th Lok Sabha: 2009 General Elections

14th Lok Sabha: 2004 General Elections
In the 2004 Lok Sabha Elections, the constituency had 122,681 eligible
voters, of whom 69.04% exercised their franchise. 
There were ten candidates. Election was conducted at 128 polling stations,
and 84,703 valid votes were counted.  
Mohanbhai Sanjibhai Delkar of the Bharatiya Navshakti Party was elected by a margin of 12,893 votes.

1971 Lok Sabha
 Ramubhai Ravjibhai Patel(INC) : 8,484 votes  
 Samjibhai Rupjibhai Delkar (NCO) : 7138

See also
Dadra and Nagar Haveli
Daman and Diu (Lok Sabha constituency) 
List of Constituencies of the Lok Sabha

References

 Dadra And Nagar Haveli Lok Sabha Election 2019 Delkar Mohanbhai Sanjibhai

Lok Sabha constituencies in Dadra and Nagar Haveli and Daman and Diu
Lok Sabha
Elections in Dadra and Nagar Haveli
1967 establishments in Dadra and Nagar Haveli
Constituencies established in 1967